Erie Commodores FC is an American soccer team based in Erie, Pennsylvania which competes in the National Premier Soccer League (NPSL), a nationwide amateur league at the fourth tier of the American Soccer Pyramid. The team plays their home matches at Saxon Stadium on the campus of Mercyhurst University. In 2021, the Commodores added a pro-am women's team to play in United Women's Soccer. They also added men's and women's teams to the Ohio Valley Premier League for the 2022 season.

The "Commodores" name alludes to Oliver Hazard Perry, a United States Navy commodore who based his operations at Erie's Presque Isle Bay during the Battle of Lake Erie, a flashpoint in the War of 1812. The "Don't Give up the Ship" motto on the crest also derives from Commodore Perry.

History

Pedro Argaez, a local soccer coach, formed Erie Admirals SC in 2009, developing the club from an established youth soccer program by the same name. John Melody, an alumnus of Mercyhurst University in Erie, served Argaez as head coach, later acquiring full ownership while continuing to lead the team. On April 24, 2015, Melody officially re-branded his club as Erie Commodores FC. He also hired fellow Mercyhurst graduate, Micky Blythe, as head coach for one season. Subsequently, Neil Brown, who received an internationally prestigious “A” license from UEFA, helped lead Commodores FC in their 2015 NPSL campaign.

Several players who once played for Commodores FC moved on to the professional soccer ranks: Adam Clement with Vancouver Whitecaps FC of Major League Soccer (MLS); Jeremy Deighton, Greg Blum, and Neil Shaffer with Pittsburgh Riverhounds SC of the United Soccer League; Dan Howell in Iceland; Billy Colton in New Zealand, Sam Dorf in Ireland and Israel, and, most recently, Danny Deakin, who was drafted by Orlando City SC of MLS.

Erie Commodores FC has rivalries with other Rust Belt conference NPSL clubs, to include Cleveland SC (Cleveland, Ohio), and FC Buffalo (Buffalo, New York). They had a rivalry with Detroit City FC (Detroit, Michigan) until Detroit left the NPSL for the National Independent Soccer Association. The club participates in the Erie County Derby against FC Buffalo, a regional NPSL rivalry pitting Erie County, Pennsylvania and Erie County, New York.

In 2020, the Commodores competed in the NPSL Members Cup along with Cleveland SC, FC Buffalo, and the Pittsburgh Hotspurs.

Current roster
As of May 17, 2022

Year-by-year

Honors
National:
 NPSL National runners-up: 2009
 NPSL National semifinalist, 3rd Place winner: 2011
Region/Historic Equivalent:
 NPSL Midwest Region Champions: 2013
 NPSL Northeast Division Champions: 2011
 NPSL Eastern Division champions: 2009
Conference/Historic Equivalent:
 NPSL Midwest Region-East Conference champions: 2017, 2018
 NPSL Midwest-Great Lakes Conference champions: 2012
 NPSL Northeast Division-Keystone Conference champions: 2011
 NPSL Eastern Keystone Division champions: 2009
Rivalry:
 Erie County Derby Champions (vs FC Buffalo): 2009, 2010, 2011, 2012, 2013, 2014, 2018, 2022

Staff

Owner
  John Melody (2010–present)
  Pedro Argaez (2009–2010)

Head coach
  Dan Howell (2015)
  Micky Blythe (2014)
  John Melody (2009–2013, 2016–present)

Assistant coach
  Neil Brown (2011–2014)
  Micky Blythe (2009–2013)

Stadia
 Saxon Stadium (2022–Present)
 McConnell Family Stadium (2013, 2016–2021)
 Gus Anderson Field (2014–2015)
 Dollinger Field (2012–2013)
 Penn State Behrend Soccer/Lacrosse Complex (2010–2011)
 Family First Sports Park (2009-2010)

References

External links
 
 Erie Commodores FC (on the NPSL homepage)

National Premier Soccer League teams
Amateur soccer teams in Pennsylvania
Soccer clubs in Pennsylvania
2009 establishments in Pennsylvania
Association football clubs established in 2009